HMS Trusty was a 50-gun fourth-rate ship of the line of the Royal Navy.

Design 

Designed by Edward Hunt and built at Sheerness Dockyard, the Trusty extended the design of Hunt's earlier ships by 2 ft (0.6 m). Like Cato, she featured the beakhead bulkhead, roundhouse with gallery, and solid bulwarks along the quarterdeck. The large roundhouse was surmounted by further solid bulwarks into which a fourth tier of gunports was cut for the carronades mounted on the poopdeck. The mizzen channels were moved up above the aftmost quarterdeck gunports.

Service 
Trusty was launched on 9 October 1782. 

Trusty was at Plymouth on 20 January 1795 and so shared in the proceeds of the detention of the Dutch naval vessels, East Indiamen, and other merchant vessels that were in port on the outbreak of war between Britain and the Netherlands.

Trusty was refitted and used as a troopship from July 1799. Because she served in the Navy's Egyptian campaign (8 March – 2 September 1801), her officers and crew qualified for the "Egypt" clasp to the Naval General Service Medal, which the Admiralty issued in 1847 to all surviving claimants.

Trusty was refitted again as a prison ship from April 1809.

Fate
Trusty was broken up in April 1815.

References 

1782 ships
Ships of the line of the Royal Navy